The Next Fifty Years: Science in the First Half of the Twenty-First Century is a 2002 collection of essays by twenty-five well-known scientists, edited by Edge Foundation founder John Brockman, who wrote the introduction.

The essays contain speculation by the authors about the scientific and technological advances that are likely to occur in their various fields in the first half of the 21st century.

The collection is divided into two parts; the twelve essays in Part One are devoted to more theoretical speculation, whereas the thirteen essays in Part Two discuss the possible practical applications of scientific and technological advance.

The contributing scientists are:

 Lee Smolin, The Future of the Nature of the Universe
 Martin Rees, Cosmological Challenges: Are We Alone, and Where?
 Ian Stewart, The Mathematics of 2050
 Brian Goodwin, In the Shadow of Culture
 Marc D. Hauser, Swappable Minds
 Alison Gopnik, What Children Will Teach Scientists
 Paul Bloom, Toward a Theory of Moral Development
 Geoffrey Miller, The Science of Subtlety
 Mihaly Csikszentmihalyi, The Future of Happiness
 Robert M. Sapolsky, Will We Still Be Sad Fifty Years from Now?
 Steven Strogatz, Fermi's "Little Discovery" and the Future of Chaos and Complexity Theory
 Stuart Kauffman, What Is Life?
 Richard Dawkins, Son of Moore's Law
 Paul Davies, Was There a Second Genesis?
 John H. Holland, What Is to Come and How to Predict It?
 Rodney Brooks, The Merger of Flesh and Machines
 Peter Atkins, The Future of Matter
 Roger C. Schank, Are We Going to Get Smarter?
 Jaron Lanier, The Complexity Ceiling
 David Gelernter, Tapping Into the Beam
 Joseph E. LeDoux, Mind, Brain, and Self
 Judith Rich Harris, What Makes Us the Way We Are: The View from 2050
 Samuel Barondes, Drugs, DNA, and the Analyst's Couch
 Nancy Etcoff, Brain Scans, Wearables, and Brief Encounters
 Paul W. Ewald, Mastering Disease

2002 non-fiction books
Scientific essays
Futurology books
Books by John Brockman